Fategarh is a village in Orissa, located in Bhapur Tehsil in Nayagarh District of Odisha, India. It is 38 km far from its District Main City Nayagarh. It is 60 km far from its state capital Bhubaneswar.

It is also a main entrance path to Nayagarh district from Bhubaneswar. , the village has a population of 4,611, which is quite large compared to the average size of a typical village in Odisha. Nearby tourist places are Shree Neela madhava Temple, Tarabalo Hot spring (the second largest Hot spring of India), Barakhola hillside, mundiapada hillside, Mahanadi Ghat, Kachera Lake, Kaligiri River, Khandapara Palace, Pathani Samant Chandrasekhar's Birthplace and Orissa's longest over bridge(1.2 km) over Mahanadi river here, Connecting Cuttack District towards north-east.

Now in 2022 there's going to make a big Ram mandir at hill (Mundia in local word)

Attractive places for tourists in Fategarh

Shree Neela madhava Temple
Origin Of Orissa's Culture and tradition. i.e. The Ancient worship place of Lord Jagannath. Nila Madhava is the name of the idol that was in the possession of a tribal king name Viswavasu. Mythology says that, in the 11th  century, sebak Biswavasu and his ancestor worshiping idol of Neela madhava in a secret cave.(a long story inside) after intervention of Raja Indradyumna, Lord Neela madhaba Placed to Shreekhetra 'Puri' well Knowned as Lord Jagannath. Jagannath Temple, Puri.

Tarabalo Hot Spring
The hot spring is an attractive place for tourists. Tourists visit in winter season for many reasons like bath, worship research purposes. Its managing authority has arranged Four  pools specially for bath only. It is also recorded as second big Hot spring In India.

Barakhola and Mundiapada Hillside
Preferred Tourist place in winter. Local exhibition, Fair arranged for tourists in this hillsides in different occasions.

Mahanadi Ghat
Tourists entertain Boating here in summer. Bhattarika ghat, padmavati ghat is two  famous ghat for tourists.

Kachera Lake
Touched River kaligiri east to Fategarh. Famous for sight seeing, during rainy season when River Mahanadi swells. During winter, few migratory birds flock to the lake. Good site for fishing/catching crab with local fisherman.

Khandapara Palace
Rajbati (Fort) of ancient ruler of Khandapara. It also includes Museum of old history of rulers and their kingdom.

Pathani samanta Chandrasekhar's Birth Place
Pathani Samant (1835-1904) was an eminent astronomer of Orissa. He was conferred the title 'Mahamahoadhyaya' by the British government in 1893, in recognition to his contribution in the field of astronomy. Pathani Samanta Chandrasekhar was born at Khandapara in Nayagarh District. He chose Sanskrit as his medium of education instead of English. He achieved great expertise in traditional Indian astronomy. During his research, he constructed many instruments using the local available materials like wooden sticks and bamboo pieces. His knowledge in astronomy ensured that these instruments had great accuracy in their measurement. His findings are recorded in his book titled 'Siddhanta Darpana', which is written in Sanskrit. This book won him wide acclaim and fame, finding special mention in the European and American press in the year 1899.
Pathani Samanta Chandrasekhar's calculations are referred in the preparation of almanacs in Orissa. The Pathani Samanta Planetarium situated at capital Bhubaneswar, is dedicated to him.

Pana Sankranti 
This festival is the most sought after festival in the village. It is celebrated both in the day as well as in the night. One can see, people walking in fire during the march of goddesses. One can get a real feeling of the old traditions, which still exists. Thanks to a group of dedicated people and the characters have been passed on the next generations successfully.

References

External links
 

Villages in Nayagarh district